The Anzalduas Port of Entry opened on December 15, 2009, with the completion of the Anzalduas International Bridge.  The bridge is over three miles long and cost over $28 million to build.  It was designed to divert traffic from the congested Hidalgo Texas Port of Entry.

The presidential permit under which the bridge was constructed prohibited commercial traffic from using it until 2015, or when the Hidalgo Port of Entry averages more than 15,000 commercial entries per week.  Commercial trucks and pedestrians continue to be prohibited from entering the US via this crossing; however, empty trucks may travel southbound to Mexico.  The bridge has a dedicated commuter lane (SENTRI) that is open on restricted hours and frequently open to the general public during high traffic hours without notice.

See also
 List of Mexico–United States border crossings
 List of Canada–United States border crossings

References

Mexico–United States border crossings
2009 establishments in Texas
Buildings and structures completed in 2009
Buildings and structures in Hidalgo County, Texas